Sir Theodore "Robbie" Fortescue Fox  (26 November 1899 – 19 June 1989) was a British physician and medical editor.

After graduating from Leighton Park School in 1918, Theodore Fox, as a Quaker, joined the Friends' Ambulance Unit and served in France for eight months. With the benefit of a scholarship, he matriculated, in 1919, at Pembroke College, Cambridge. After education at the University Cambridge and medical training at the London Hospital, he qualified MRCS, LRCS (i.e. Member of the RCS, Licentiate of the RCS) in 1924. 

At the London Hospital he was house physician to Sir Robert Hutchison. After a round trip to India as a ship's surgeon, Fox undertook, in 1925, locum work at the editorial office of The Lancet. He graduated in 1926 BChir, in 1937 MB, and in 1938 MD from the University of Cambridge.

Fox continued his editorial work at The Lancet until the start of WWII. He served for three years in the RAMC. 
During WWII he was a regimental medical officer in France before he was evacuated from Cherbourg. He then worked in the RAMC's Army Blood Transfusion Service before he joined the War Office to edit the Army Medical Department Bulletin. At the request of The Lancets editor-in-chief Egbert Morland, the RAMC released Fox to return to editorial work at The Lancets wartime office in Aylesbury. In 1944, Morland retired and Fox became The Lancets editor-in-chief. Fox was elected FRCP in 1946. He was heavily involved in the discussions and controversies concerning the establishment of the National Health Service.

Fox was, in 1951, the Croonian Lecturer. He gave in 1963 the Heath Clark lectures, which were published as Crisis in Communication (London, The Athlone Press, 1965). In 1965, he delivered the Harveian Oration on Purposes of Medicine. In 1966 he gave the Maurice Bloch lecture at the University of Glasgow.

He was a prolific letter writer and sent his famous hand-painted Christmas cards (Fox cards) to his friends. He was knighted in 1962.

In 1930 he married Margaret Evelyn McDougall (1906–1970). They had four sons. Robin Fox, their youngest son, was editor of The Lancet from 1990 to 1995. T. Fortescue Fox's father was Robert Fortescue Fox, MD, FRCP, a pioneer of physical therapy.

Selected publications

 (See William Bean.)

References

External links

1899 births
1989 deaths
20th-century British medical doctors
People educated at Leighton Park School
Alumni of Pembroke College, Cambridge
Royal Army Medical Corps officers
Fellows of the Royal College of Physicians
Knights Bachelor
People associated with the Friends' Ambulance Unit
People from Ross and Cromarty
People from Rotherfield
The Lancet editors
Scottish military personnel
British Army personnel of World War II